Marquis Ai may refer to:

Marquis Ai of Jin (died 709 BC)
Marquis Ai of Cai (died 675 BC)
Marquess Ai of Han (died 374 BC)
Cao Chong (196–208), son of the warlord Cao Cao, posthumously honored as Marquis Ai of Deng

See also
Duke Ai (disambiguation)